Portraits is an album by composer/bassist Graham Collier recorded in 1972 and originally released on the Bristol Saydisc label.

Reception

Allmusic said "This is a more laid-back, yet more challenging listen than any previous Collier outing, but it also dates as one of the best". On All About Jazz Nic Jones noted "it's an outstanding example of work in the modal idiom. With small groups, Collier had really telling abilities that have been banished to the past by his work with large ensembles in the intervening years, but no matter. Here he manages again to coax maximum mileage and color out of a six piece band".

Track listing
All compositions by Graham Collier.

 "And Now for Something Completely Different Part One" – 16:50
 "And Now for Something Completely Different Part Two" – 9:57
 "Portraits 1" – 10:57

Personnel
Graham Collier – bass
Dick Pearce – flugelhorn
Peter Hurt – alto saxophone
Ed Speight – guitar
Geoff Castle – piano
John Webb – drums

References

1973 albums
Graham Collier albums
Albums produced by Terry Brown (record producer)